Ryan Parent (born March 17, 1987) is a Canadian former professional ice hockey defenceman who played for the Philadelphia Flyers and the Vancouver Canucks of the National Hockey League (NHL). He is currently an assistant coach with the Utica Comets.

Playing career
Parent who was born in Prince Albert, Saskatchewan, grew up in the remote town of Sioux Lookout, Ontario, playing minor hockey for the Flyers rep program until his minor bantam year.  At age 15, he played AAA hockey for the Thunder Bay Kings Bantam team and was a teammate of future NHL'ers Tom Pyatt and Marc Staal. Parent was then signed by the Waterloo Siskins Jr.B. team for the 2002-03 season before being drafted by the Guelph Storm in the 1st round (8th overall) in the 2003 OHL Priority Selection.

Parent was drafted by the Nashville Predators in the first round, 18th overall, in the 2005 NHL Entry Draft. After playing three seasons in the Ontario Hockey League with the Guelph Storm, Parent joined the Milwaukee Admirals for the 2006 American Hockey League playoffs.  He returned to the Guelph Storm for the 2006–07 season. Parent also played on both Canada's 2006 and 2007 World Jr. Hockey Championship gold-medal winning teams.

On February 15, 2007, Parent was traded along with Scottie Upshall, a 1st-round draft pick, and a 3rd-round draft pick to the Philadelphia Flyers in exchange for Peter Forsberg. On April 5, 2007, Parent made his NHL debut with the Flyers against the New Jersey Devils. He scored his first NHL goal during the 2009–10 season in a 7-4 Flyers loss against the Florida Panthers.

Parent is considered a defensive specialist and he has been often compared to NHL players Scott Hannan and Robyn Regehr. He was nicknamed "Bernie" by his Flyers teammates because of former Flyers net minder Bernie Parent. The two are not related and pronounce their last names differently.

On June 19, 2010, Parent was traded back to the Nashville Predators for the rights to Dan Hamhuis  and a conditional draft pick in 2011 (in case Philadelphia did not sign Hamhuis). However, before the regular season began Parent was traded to the Vancouver Canucks along with Jonas Andersson for Shane O'Brien and Dan Gendur.  Vancouver then put Parent on waivers. Parent cleared waivers but wasn't demoted immediately. He dressed for 4 games for the Canucks before he injured his groin. When he recovered, he was reassigned to the Canucks' AHL affiliate, the Manitoba Moose. He was recalled to the Canucks several times over the 2010-11 season, but didn't dress for another NHL game. Before the 2011-12 season, Parent was assigned by the Canucks to their new AHL affiliate, the Chicago Wolves. Parent was loaned to Team Canada for the 2011 Spengler Cup.

As an Unrestricted Free Agent going into the 2012–13 season due to the NHL lock-out, Parent was signed to a professional try-out contract with the Norfolk Admirals of the AHL on October 24, 2012. Parent was later signed by NHL affiliate, the Anaheim Ducks, on a one-year contract on January 16, 2013.

Coaching career
On August 23, 2018, Parent was named as an assistant coach for the Binghamton Devils.

Career statistics

Regular season and playoffs

International

Awards and honours

References

External links
 

1987 births
Living people
Canadian ice hockey defencemen
Chicago Wolves players
Guelph Storm players
Ice hockey people from Ontario
Ice hockey people from Saskatchewan
Manitoba Moose players
Milwaukee Admirals players
Nashville Predators draft picks
National Hockey League first-round draft picks
Norfolk Admirals players
Ontario Reign (ECHL) players
People from Sioux Lookout
Philadelphia Flyers players
Philadelphia Phantoms players
St. John's IceCaps players
Sportspeople from Prince Albert, Saskatchewan
Vancouver Canucks players
Wilkes-Barre/Scranton Penguins players